The 1992–93 Sunshine Hockey League season was the first season of the Sunshine Hockey League, a North American minor pro league. Five teams participated in the league, and the West Palm Beach Blaze won the Sunshine Cup.

Regular season

Sunshine Cup-Playoffs

External links
 Season 1992/93 on hockeydb.com

Sunshine Hockey League seasons
Sun